Kent V. Nelson is a superhero appearing in American comic books published by DC Comics and is the seventh character to bear the Doctor Fate codename. The character was created by Steve Gerber and Justiniano, and served as another attempt to revitalize the Doctor Fate character. 

In the DC Universe continuity, Kent V. Nelson was an accomplished psychiatrist whose career and marriage fell apart due to an extramarital affair and depression. The character would become the next successor of Doctor Fate and a member of the Justice Society of America, portrayed as struggling with his lack of real expertise in magic despite adopting a legacy in which includes proficient spell-casters. The character would serve as an incarnation of the Doctor Fate character until the New 52 reboot, in which retroactively erased the character.

Publication history

In early 2007, DC published a bi-weekly run of one-shots depicting the search for a new Doctor Fate. These were intended to be followed by a new Doctor Fate ongoing series in April 2007, written by Steve Gerber and illustrated by Paul Gulacy, featuring the new Doctor Fate. However, the series was delayed due to extended production and creative difficulties. Gerber said in an interview for Newsarama that the story intended for the first arc of the Doctor Fate ongoing series had been reworked to serve as the main story for Countdown to Mystery, a dual-feature eight-issue miniseries with Eclipso as the second feature. The first issue of Countdown to Mystery, with art by Justiniano and Walden Wong rather than Gulacy, was released in November 2007. Due to Gerber's death, the seventh issue was written by Adam Beechen using Gerber's notes. The final issue was written by Beechen, Gail Simone, Mark Waid, and Mark Evanier, who each wrote a different ending to the story.

The character then appeared in the Reign in Hell miniseries and in Justice Society of America (vol. 3) #30 (August 2009), featuring in the book until its cancellation with #54 in August 2011.

Fictional character biography
When the JSA looks for Hector, they find the helmet, amulet, and cloak. Sand dons the helmet to speak with Nabu. At the same moment, Mordru appears and removes the helmet from Sand, allowing Nabu to manifest through the helmet without needing a host body. Nabu defeats Mordru and the JSA offers him membership, which Nabu declines. Sensing his impending demise, Nabu gives the helmet to Detective Chimp to pass on to a new wearer, telling him it would still have certain abilities without Nabu's spirit inside. Nabu is then killed by the Spectre.

When Detective Chimp finds the helmet will not fit him, he asks Captain Marvel to throw the helmet into space, allowing the helmet to find its new owner. As it travels across the universe, the helmet warps itself to resemble Kent Nelson's half helmet from the 1940s and falls back to Earth.

The helmet later crosses paths again with Detective Chimp, Ibis the Invincible, Sargon the Sorcerer, Black Alice, and Zauriel before it reaches Doctor Kent V. Nelson, Kent Nelson's grandnephew, who becomes the new Doctor Fate after finding the helmet in a dumpster. When Nelson first wears the helmet, it reverts to its original form and clothes him in a new version of Doctor Fate's original costume.

After fighting off the demon Nergal, Kent uses the helmet's magic for gambling. He later meets Maddy, an occult bookstore owner, and Inza Fox, a comic book writer, who is later killed after turning into water. When Kent turns to alcohol to cope with Inza's death, he gives the helmet to Maddy. The two are captured by Nergal, but escape when Kent overcomes his depression, restoring Inza to life in the process.

Kent helps a group of magic-using heroes escape from Hell and joins the Justice Society. Kent remains with the team after it splits into two groups.  He is briefly possessed by Mordru before leaving Earth to hone his spellcasting abilities. Kent later returns to help the team with various problems.

Powers, abilities, and resources 
Initially portrayed in earlier stories and depictions as an underdeveloped, novice sorcerer relying on both his limited skills and Doctor Fate's reputation to intimidte and grant him an edge against other opponents, Kent would eventually study and later became more experienced and powerful enough to be among the most powerful sorcerers in the DC Universe, having been explicitly referred to as a "Sorcerer Supreme".

With the Helmet of Fate, Kent's access to the powerful artifact allows him for numerous aibliites, namely the power of spell-casting; Kent himself possss knowledge of general and basic spells and uses the helm to access a library of spells within the artifact to cast more advanced spells. Kent also possess other artifacts such as the Cloak of Destiny and the Amulet of Anubis; the amulet grants him protection against to psychic/astral probing, allows for mind control, and bolsters a user's magical power. The cloak is both fireproof and highly resistant towards magic. In addition to his powers, Kent was a successful psychiatrist and was able to use his skills to analyze others.

Weaknesses 
Unlike other incarnations of Doctor Fate, the Helmet of Fate lacked its traditional connection to the Lords of Order and Nabu due to their demise, forcing Kent to learn of the Helm's functions without guidance. In addition, the Helm and its associate artifacts are the center piece of Kent's power, rendering him powerless if deprived of it.

References

External links

Characters created by J. M. DeMatteis
Characters created by Steve Gerber
Comics characters introduced in 2007
DC Comics characters who can teleport
DC Comics characters who use magic
DC Comics male superheroes
DC Comics fantasy characters
DC Comics titles
Earth-Two
Fictional avatars
Fictional characters from parallel universes
Fictional occult and psychic detectives
Mythology in DC Comics
Fictional psychiatrists
Fictional wizards
Fictional Scottish people
Doctor Fate